Martin Stanley Buckmaster, 3rd Viscount Buckmaster  (11 April 1921 – 8 June 2007) was a British diplomat. He sat on the crossbenches in the House of Lords from 1974.

Buckmaster was the elder son of Owen Buckmaster, 2nd Viscount Buckmaster, a barrister and Lloyd's underwriter, and his first wife, Joan Simpson. His grandfather was Stanley Buckmaster, 1st Viscount Buckmaster, a barrister and Liberal MP who served as Solicitor General for England and Wales from 1913 to 1915 and was created 1st Viscount Buckmaster in 1915 when he became Lord Chancellor.

Buckmaster was educated at Stowe School. On the outbreak of World War II, he joined the Royal Sussex Regiment straight from school. After receiving his commission in August 1940 he served in the Middle East and was granted the honorary rank of Captain when he relinquished his commission in June 1953.

Buckmaster was demobilised in 1946 and joined the Foreign Office, using his experience of the Middle East to good effect. He was a political officer in Abu Dhabi from 1955 to 1958, and then First Secretary at the British embassy in Libya until 1963. After serving in Bahrain, he moved to Kampala to become First Secretary in Uganda from 1969 to 1971. He later served in Beirut and Yemen, retiring in 1981. He was appointed an Officer of the Order of the British Empire (OBE) in the 1979 Birthday Honours.

He became Viscount Buckmaster on his father's death in 1974, his father having inherited the title in 1934. He took a seat on the crossbenches in the House of Lords, speaking mainly on matters relating to the Middle East. He was vice-chairman of the Council for the Advancement of Arab-British Understanding.

A committed Christian, he also spoke on issues of public morality.  He was a member of the Conservative Family Campaign, and a patron of the Christian Broadcasting Council.

He was succeeded to the viscountcy by his nephew, Adrian Buckmaster, son of his younger brother, Hon. Colin John Buckmaster.

References

Viscount Buckmaster, obituary, The Telegraph, London, 14 June 2007

External links

thepeerage.com

British diplomats
Diplomatic peers
British Army personnel of World War II
Royal Sussex Regiment officers
Officers of the Order of the British Empire
Viscounts in the Peerage of the United Kingdom
People educated at Stowe School
1921 births
2007 deaths
British expatriates in the United Arab Emirates
British expatriates in Libya
British expatriates in Bahrain
British expatriates in Uganda
British expatriates in Lebanon
British expatriates in Yemen
Buckmaster